The 2015 New York City FC season was the club's first season of existence, their first season in the top tier of American soccer, and their first season in Major League Soccer. New York City FC played their home games at Yankee Stadium in the New York City borough of The Bronx.

Background 
MLS commissioner Don Garber announced the league's intent to award a second team in the New York area in 2010, with the new team originally aimed to begin operations by 2013. Initially, the league held talks with New York Mets owner Fred Wilpon about a second NY club and with owners of the rebooted New York Cosmos. The Wilpons' interest in MLS reportedly faded following the family's losses in the Madoff investment scandal, while the Cosmos began playing in the second-tier North American Soccer League in 2013.

Garber had previously cultivated an interest in acquiring investment from a major European soccer team to be owners of a future franchise, and in December 2008, he announced a bid for a Miami expansion team led by FC Barcelona that was to begin play in 2010, though the bid eventually fell through (Garber also briefly discussed Barcelona investing in a New York franchise before moving the focus to Miami).

But when Ferran Soriano, Barcelona's vice president at the time of the Miami bid, was appointed Manchester City CEO in August 2012, Garber reached out to him about a New York City team. In December 2012, unnamed sources told the media that Manchester City were close to being announced as the new owners of the 20th team of MLS, and the brand name "New York City Football Club" was trademarked, although the club quickly denied the report. However, Garber announced in March 2013 that he was almost ready to unveil the new expansion team,

New York City Football Club, LLC was registered with the New York State Department on May 7, 2013, and on May 21 the team was officially announced as the 20th Major League Soccer franchise.

The team announced an English-language radio deal with WFAN on October 3, 2013.

Non-competitive

Pre-season

Manchester training camp 

N.B. The friendly against St Mirren deemed the club's first ever match according to the club itself.

Carolina Challenge Cup

Post-season

Puerto Rico tour

Competitions

Major League Soccer

League tables

Eastern Conference

Overall

Results summary

Results by matchday

Matches

U.S. Open Cup 

New York City FC entered the 2015 U.S. Open Cup with all other Major League Soccer teams in the fourth round.

Squad information

Statistics

Appearances and goals 

|}

Honors

Major League Soccer Player of the Week award

Major League Soccer Team of the Week selection

Major League Soccer Goal of the Week award

Etihad Airways Player of the Month award 
Awarded to the player who receives the most votes in a poll conducted each month on the NYCFC website

Transfers

In

Out

Loan in

Loan out

Non-player transfers

References 

New York City FC seasons
New York City Fc
New York City Fc
New York City FC